The Yokohama International Women's Ekiden held in Yokohama, Japan, was one of the prominent ekiden races of the year. It was held annually from 1983 to 2009, and was discontinued because of the replacement of the Tokyo Women's Marathon by the Yokohama Women's Marathon.

The traditional Ekiden relay consists of two laps of ten kilometers, three of five kilometers and one of 7.195 meters, the total adds up to a traditional marathon.

Winners

References

Recurring sporting events established in 1983
Recurring sporting events disestablished in 2009
Road running competitions in Japan
Defunct athletics competitions
Ekiden
Women's athletics competitions
1983 establishments in Japan
2009 disestablishments in Japan
Women's sport in Japan
Defunct sports competitions in Japan